Stig Per Emanuel "Manne" Allberg (born 12 November 1985 in Sundsvall) is a Swedish curler.

He is six-time Swedish junior champion (2001, 2002, 2003, 2005, 2006, 2007).

Teams

Men's

Mixed

References

External links
 
 

Living people
1985 births
Swedish male curlers